Alexander González Garces (born on 1 January 1973), is a Cuban football coach. He was national team manager of the Cuba national team.  He was appointed on April 16, 2012.

He was appointed to the following a spell in charge of the Cuban representative team at the 2011 Pan American Games.

References

External links 
 Profile at SoccerWay

1973 births
Living people
Cuba national football team managers
Cuban football managers